Manzac-sur-Vern is a commune in the Dordogne department in Nouvelle-Aquitaine in southwestern France.

History
There are near the town both prehistoric Gallo-Roman traces. In the Middle Ages, Manzac had a former Priory of the Abbey of Brantôme and in November 27, 1911, the commune of Manzac was renamed Manzac-sur-Vern

Notable residents
 Léonce Cubélier de Beynac (1866-1942), poet.
 Christian Pabœuf (1956- ) composer.
 Valentin Huot (1929-2017) cyclist.

Population

Gallery

Significant landmarks
Significant landmarks include the Saint-Pierre-ès-links a 15th-century church with façade (shown right) dating from the 19th century and Gothic bell tower. 
 Chartreuse de la Faye a listed historical site.
 Leyzarnie Castle, rebuilt in the early 20th century, also a listed historic monuments.
 Tower of the former Castle of the Châtenet.
 Chartreuse of Couture.
 Manor de dives du, from the 17th century.
 Cluzeau à Bencharel.

See also
Communes of the Dordogne department

References

Communes of Dordogne
Dordogne communes articles needing translation from French Wikipedia